Paul Quinn may refer to:

Paul Quinn (footballer, born 1961), Scottish footballer
Paul Quinn (footballer, born 1985), Scottish footballer (Motherwell FC, Cardiff City, Aberdeen FC, Ross County)
Paul Quinn (Missouri politician) (born 1943), member of the Missouri House of Representatives
Paul Quinn (murder victim) (c. 1986–2007), murder victim.
Paul Quinn (New Zealand politician), New Zealand rugby union player and politician
Paul Quinn (rugby league, born 1938) (1938–2015), Australian rugby league footballer
Paul Quinn (rugby league, born 1972), Australian rugby league footballer
Paul Quinn (singer) (born 1959), Scottish singer, lead singer of Bourgie Bourgie
 Paul Quinn, English lead guitarist of the band Saxon

See also 
Paul Quinn College, private, historically black college (HBCU) located in Dallas, Texas
William Paul Quinn (1788–1873), African Methodist Episcopal bishop and namesake of Paul Quinn College